Padmâvatî is an opera in two acts by the French composer Albert Roussel. The libretto, by Louis Laloy, is based on Théodore-Marie Pavie's La légende de Padmanî, reine de Tchitor, which retells the legend recounted in Malik Muhammad Jayasi's poem Padmavat (1540). It was first performed at the Paris Opéra on June 1, 1923. Roussel styled the work an opéra-ballet and there are many dance numbers and opportunities for spectacle. The composer was inspired by his visit to the ruined city of Chittor in Rajputana (now Rajasthan) and he incorporated many features of Indian music into the score.

Roles

Synopsis
Place: Chittor, India
Time: around 1300

Act One
The sultan of Khilji Dynasty Alaouddin is besieging the city of Chittor. He comes to its ruler, Ratan-Sen, asking for peace negotiations. Ratan-Sen shows him around the city. Alaouddin also asks to be granted a glimpse of Ratan-Sen's wife, Padmâvatî, who is legendary for her beauty. Ratan-Sen reluctantly agrees. Alaouddin refuses to make peace unless Padmâvatî is handed over to him.

Act Two
The Khilji army attack the city and Padmâvatî and the wounded Ratan-Sen take refuge in the temple of Siva. Ratan-Sen tells his wife that the people will be massacred unless she gives herself to Alaouddin. Ratan-Sen is stoned to death, and Padmâvatî joins him on his funeral pyre rather than giving herself to Alaouddin.

Recordings
Padmâvatî, Marilyn Horne, Nicolai Gedda, Jane Berbié, José van Dam, Marc Vento,  Toulouse Capitole Orchestra, conducted by Michel Plasson (EMI)
 Padmâvatî, Rita Gorr (Padmâvatî), Albert Lance (Ratan-Sen), Gérard Souzay (Alaouddin). London Symphony Orchestra and BBC Chorus, conducted by Jean Martinon (Gala)

Sources
The Viking Opera Guide ed. Holden (Viking, 1993)
Del Teatro (in Italian)

The Oxford Illustrated History of Opera ed. Parker (OUP, 1994)
Smith, Richard Langham (1992), 'Padmâvatî' in The New Grove Dictionary of Opera, ed. Stanley Sadie (London) 

French-language operas
1923 operas
Operas by Albert Roussel
Operas
Opera world premieres at the Paris Opera
Operas set in India